George H. Primrose (November 12, 1852 - July 23, 1919) was a minstrel performer.  He was one half of the comedy duo of Primrose and West with William H. West.

Primrose was born George H. Delaney in London, Ontario.

His first wife, Emily Catlin, died in Chicago, Illinois in 1903. He married Esther Nerney of San Francisco, California in Mount Vernon, New York on April 23, 1904.  He wed for the third time to his secretary, Viola Katherine Trueblood, on April 15, 1916.

He died in San Diego, California on July 23, 1919.

References

External links

Blackface minstrel performers
Vaudeville performers
1852 births
1919 deaths